Ghilamara Town High School  was established in 1982 in Assam, India. It has a 7560 sq. feet Assam type building. Initially there was a ME school which was established in 1979. As per government of Assam vide order no-EPG 567/01/115 dated 16/11/1991 Ghilamara Town High School was provincialized on 19 November 1991 and amalgamated with Ghilamara Town ME School on 1 August 2000. 

In three consecutive years 100% of the students passed the HSLC Examination, for which the government of Assam recognized Ghilamara Town High School as the "Best distinguish performance school" of Assam. In 2011 Ghilamara Town High School received a cheque for Rs.5,00,000/ (Rupees five lakhs) as a distinguished performance school grant for infrastructure development of the school.

Land 
 Total 18 Bigha land
 School building 11 Bigha
 Play ground 7 Bigha

Location
The school is located in Ghilamara Milan Nagar at Lakhimpur district of Assam, India.
The map can be viewed at the following websites:
http://wikimapia.org/11979785/Ghilamara-Town-HS-School
http://wikimapia.org/25330925/Ghilamara-Town-HS-School-Playground

Staff 
26 high school teachers, 9 HS teachers, 4 office assistants, more than 750 students

Facilities 
DNA Club, Computer laboratory, library and hostel. There are laboratories for Physics, Chemistry, Biology, and Computing.

DNA Club
The school has its version of DNA club( department of biotechnology natural resources awareness club) where the students are taken for Eco camps from time to time. The associated picture gallery can be viewed at Photo Gallery

Computer lab
The Computer lab of the school consists of 10 IBM PCs LAN connected with UPS. The computers have Windows XP operating system and all other language packages which are necessary for the syllabus prescribed by the SEBA and AHSEC.

Library
The library was established in memory of Rantu Konch and Palash Chetia, two students who died in an accident while taking part in the marathon competition of the annual sports of 2005. The library has 1651 numbers of book including story, novel, biography, travelogue, essays etc.

Hostel
A hostel is under construction.

Internet
It is perhaps the first government school in Assam to go online with a website, a blog, an 
online alumni directory, a collaborative learning platform for students( the help-desk forum) and is in the process of implementing an ERP system on its own to streamline the organizational processes of the institution.

Blog
Official school blog

Alumni directory
The school is building an online alumni directory where ex-students can attach resume, skills, years of experiences, qualifications, whether looking for jobs or not, type of jobs looking for etc. so that it can be used as a Resume Service for HR managers.
Alumni Directory of School

Help desk
A student help-desk in the form of an online forum is also in the making. This is visioned as a learning source for the students where they can ask questions regarding course materials, careers, question papers, mathematics, physics Olympiad-related topics etc. and knowledgeable ex-students will try to answer them. Student Help-desk forum

References
https://web.archive.org/web/20130408052440/http://gthss.org/ Official school website

High schools and secondary schools in Assam
Lakhimpur district
Educational institutions established in 1982
1982 establishments in Assam